John David Treadgold, LVO (30 December 1931 – 15 February 2015) was an Anglican priest.

He was born on 30 December 1931  and educated at the University of Nottingham, he was ordained after a period of study at Wells Theological College in 1960. He was the Vicar Choral at Southwell Minster and then held  incumbencies at Wollaton and St Cuthbert's Church, Darlington. A canon at St. George's Chapel, Windsor Castle, he became Dean of Chichester in 1989, retiring in 2001. A carved gargoyle at Chichester Cathedral was inspired by his face.

He died on 15 February 2015.

References

1931 births
2015 deaths
Alumni of the University of Nottingham
Deans of Chichester
Lieutenants of the Royal Victorian Order
Canons of Windsor